CCRA may refer to:

 Camp Chase Industrial Railroad (reporting code), Columbus, Ohio, United States
 Canada Customs and Revenue Agency, a 1999–2003 Canadian government body
 Center City Residents' Association, an organization in Philadelphia, Pennsylvania, United States
 Certified Clinical Research Associate, an accreditation obtained through the Association of Clinical Research Professionals
 Climate Change Risk Assessment, an exercise & report by the UK Government
 Common Criteria Recognition Arrangement, an international mutual recognition arrangement